Artists and Models is a 1937 black-and-white American musical comedy film, directed by Raoul Walsh and starring Jack Benny and Ida Lupino. It was produced by Lewis E. Gensler.

In 1937, the film received an Oscar nomination at the Academy of Motion Picture Arts and Sciences for Best Song: Whispers in the Dark, sung by Connee Boswell with Andre Kostelanetz and His Orchestra.

Cast
Jack Benny - Mac Brewster
Ida Lupino - Paula Sewell/Monterey
Richard Arlen - Alan Townsend
Gail Patrick - Cynthia Wentworth
Ben Blue - Jupiter Pluvius
Judy Canova - Toots
Cecil Cunningham - Stella
Donald Meek - Dr. Zimmer
Hedda Hopper - Mrs. Townsend
Guest Stars (as themselves):
Peter Arno
Rube Goldberg
Louis Armstrong
Connee Boswell
The Canova Family
Andre Kostelanetz
Martha Raye
Yacht Club Boys

Songs
 "Whispers in the Dark"
 by Friedrich Hollaender and Leo Robin
 Sung by Connie Boswell
 "Mister Esquire"
 Lyrics by Ted Koehler
 Music by Victor Young
 "I Have Eyes"
 Lyrics by Leo Robin
 Music by Ralph Rainger
 "Pop Goes the Bubble"
 Lyrics by Ted Koehler
 Music by Burton Lane
 "Public Melody No. 1"
 Lyrics by Ted Koehler
 Music by Harold Arlen
 Sung by Martha Raye and Louis Armstrong (staged by Vincente Minnelli, his first assignment in Hollywood)
 "Stop You're Breaking My Heart"
 Lyrics by Ted Koehler
 Music by Burton Lane
 "Moonlight and Shadows"
 Music by Friedrich Hollaender 
 Lyrics by Leo Robin

References

External links

1937 films
1937 musical comedy films
American musical comedy films
American black-and-white films
Films about advertising
Films directed by Raoul Walsh
Paramount Pictures films
1930s American films